The following Union Army units and commanders fought in the Battle of Fredericksburg of the American Civil War. Order of battle compiled from the army organization during the campaign. The Confederate order of battle is listed separately.

Abbreviations used

Military ranks
 MG = Major General
 BG = Brigadier General
 Col = Colonel
 Ltc = Lieutenant Colonel
 Maj = Major
 Cpt = Captain
 Lt = 1st Lieutenant

Other
 w = wounded
 mw = mortally wounded
 k = killed

Army of the Potomac

MG Ambrose Burnside, Commanding

Chief of Staff: MG John Parke
Chief of Artillery: BG Henry Jackson Hunt
Inspector General: BG Delos B. Sackett

General Headquarters units

Escort:
 Oneida (New York) Cavalry: Cpt Daniel P. Mann
 1st U.S. Cavalry, Companies. BCH&I: Cpt Marcus A. Reno
 4th U.S. Cavalry, Companies A and E: Cpt James B. McIntyre

Provost Guard: BG Marsena R. Patrick
 Sturgis (Illinois) Rifles: Cpt James Steel
 22nd New Jersey
 29th New Jersey
 30th New Jersey
 31st New Jersey
 9th New York Infantry, Company G: Cpt Charles Child
 93rd New York Infantry: Col John S. Crocker
 147th New York
 137th Pennsylvania
 2nd U.S. Cavalry: Maj Charles J. Whiting
 8th U.S. Infantry (5 companies): Cpt Royal T. Frank

Volunteer Engineer Brigade: BG Daniel Phineas Woodbury
 15th New York: Col John M. Murphy
 50th New York: Ltc William H. Pettes
 Battalion U.S. Engineers: Cpt James C. Duane

Artillery Reserve: Ltc William Hays
 5th Battery, New York Light: Cpt Elijah D. Taft
 Battery A, 1st Battalion New York Light: Cpt Otto Diederichs
 Battery B, 1st Battalion New York Light: Cpt Adolph Voegelee
 Battery C, 1st Battalion New York Light: Lt Bernhard Wever
 Battery D, 1st Battalion New York Light: Cpt Charles Kusserow
 Battery K, 1st United States: Cpt William M. Graham
 Battery A, 2nd United States: Cpt John C. Tidball
 Battery G, 4th United States: Lt Marcus P. Miller
 Battery K, 5th United States: Lt David H. Kinzie
 32nd Massachusetts Infantry, Company C: Cpt Josiah C. Fuller

Unattached Artillery: Maj Thomas S. Trumbull
 Battery B, 1st Connecticut Heavy: Cpt Albert F. Brooker
 Battery M, 1st Connecticut Heavy: Cpt Franklin A. Pratt

Right Grand Division
MG Edwin Vose Sumner

II Corps

MG Darius N. Couch

IX Corps

BG Orlando B. Willcox

Escort
 6th New York Cavalry, Company B: Cpt Hillman A. Hall
 6th New York Cavalry, Company C: Cpt William L. Heermance

Cavalry Division
BG Alfred Pleasonton

Center Grand Division
MG Joseph Hooker

III Corps

BG George Stoneman

V Corps

MG Daniel Butterfield

Left Grand Division
MG William B. Franklin

Escort
 6th Pennsylvania Cavalry: Col Richard H. Rush

I Corps

MG John F. Reynolds

Escort
 1st Maine Cavalry, Company L: Cpt Constantine Taylor

VI Corps

MG William F. Smith

Escort
 10th New York Cavalry, Company L: Lt George Vanderbilt
 6th Pennsylvania Cavalry, Company I: Cpt James Starr
 6th Pennsylvania Cavalry, Company K: Cpt Frederick C. Newhall

Reserve Grand Division

Further information:

 National Park Service: Fredericksburg & Spotsylvania National Military Park (Fredericksburg Union order of battle: Reserve Grand Division).
 Official Records, Series I, Volume XXI, Part 1, pages 935-938.

XI Corps

BG Julius Stahel

XII Corps

MG Henry Warner Slocum

Escort
 12th Illinois Cavalry, Company A: Cpt P. E. Fisher

Notes

References
U.S. War Department, The War of the Rebellion: a Compilation of the Official Records of the Union and Confederate Armies, U.S. Government Printing Office, 1880–1901.
U.S. War Department, The War of the Rebellion: a Compilation of the Official Records of the Union and Confederate Armies, U.S. Government Printing Office, 1880–1901:  Return of casualties in the Union forces commanded by Major General Ambrose E. Burnside, U. S. Army, at the battle of Fredericksburg, Va., December 11-15, 1862.
National Park Service: Fredericksburg & Spotsylvania National Military Park (Fredericksburg Union order of battle).
Civil War Home: Fredericksburg Union order of battle 

American Civil War orders of battle